The 1285 papal election, convened in Viterbo after the death of Pope Martin IV, elected Cardinal Giacomo Savelli, who took the name of Honorius IV. Because of the suspension of the Constitution Ubi periculum by Adrian V in 1276, this election was technically, perhaps, not a papal conclave.  In fact, for the first time since the tedious Election of 1268–1271, the meetings were dominated neither by the Hohenstaufen nor Charles I of Naples (who had died on January 7, 1285).  It may even be that the cardinals proceeded so swiftly to an election with the intention of forestalling any intervention from Naples.

Participants

Pope Martin IV, who was living at Perugia, never having visited the city of Rome,  was stricken ill with a slow fever on Easter Sunday, March 25, and died on March 28, 1285. At that time, there were 18 living cardinals in the Sacred College, though three of them were away as Legates and were not notified in time. Fifteen of them participated in the election of his successor:

Absentee cardinals

Three cardinals were absent:

The election of Pope Honorius IV

Fifteen cardinals assembled in the episcopal residence at Perugia on April 1, three days after the death of Martin IV. This was according to the ancient custom, rather than the Constitution "Ubi Periculum" (1274) of Pope Gregory X. In the first scrutiny on the following day, they unanimously elected Cardinal Giacomo Savelli, prior Diacanorum of the College of Cardinals.  Although he was already 75 years old, Savelli accepted his election and took the name of Honorius IV. His election and acceptance were even more surprising since he was suffering from a severe case of arthritis.  He could only get around on crutches, and he had to have a special chair designed for him so that he could be seated at the altar during Mass, and have his arm supported so that he could raise the host at the consecration. He left Perugia for Rome at some point after April 25, 1285, where his election had been welcomed because he was a leading aristocrat of the Eternal City. His father had been Senator of Rome in 1266. He took up residence at the family estate on the Aventine Hill, next to the Church of Santa Sabina. On May 19 the new Pope was ordained to the priesthood in the Vatican Basilica. On the following day, he was consecrated bishop by Cardinal-Bishop of Ostia Latino Malabranca Orsini and solemnly crowned by Cardinal Goffredo da Alatri, who became new protodeacon of the Sacred College.

Notes

Bibliography
  Bernhard Pawlicki, Papst Honorius IV. Eine Monographie (Münster 1896).
  Ferdinand Gregorovius, History of Rome in the Middle Ages, Volume V.2, second edition, revised (London: George Bell, 1906).

External links
Sede Vacante and Conclave of 1285 (Dr. J. P. Adams).
Papal election of 1285
The Catholic Encyclopedia: Honorius IV

1285
13th-century elections
1285 in Christianity
13th-century Catholicism
1285 in Europe